The 2007 Military World Games, officially the 4th CISM Military World Games were held at the twin-cities Hyderabad - Secunderabad, Andhra Pradesh, India from 14–21 October 2007.  Some parts of the games were also held in Mumbai.

According to press release by the organizers nearly 5000 athletes from 101 countries participated. The motto of the games was Friendship Through Sport. Russia emerged on top of the medal tally with 42 gold, 29 silver and 29 bronze medals. The People's Republic of China, second with 38 gold, 22 silver and 13 bronze while Germany came a distant third with 7 gold, 10 silver and 13 bronze.

Games

The Military Games torch began its journey from Leh to Kanya Kumari on 4 August 2007 and reached New Delhi on 5 August 2007.
The blasts in August 2007 at two locations in the venue city of the games created doubt as to whether the games would be held, but the organizers confirmed the event would be on schedule and as planned. It was later known that the terror cell that carried the blasts in the city also planned to attack the military games.

The opening ceremony of the games was held at the GMC Balayogi Stadium, Hyderabad. President of India Pratibha Patil declared the games open. Games ended on 21 October. The Defence Minister of India, Shri A. K. Antony declared the games closed at the G. M. C. Balayogi Athletic Stadium.

Sports
A total of fourteen sports were contested at the Games.

Medal table

References

External links
Archived version of official website
CISM website

 
Military World Games
International sports competitions hosted by India
Military World Games
Military World Games
Sports competitions in Hyderabad, India
Multi-sport events in India
Events in Hyderabad, India
October 2007 sports events in Asia